was the second vessel to be commissioned in the 19-vessel  destroyers built for the Imperial Japanese Navy in the late 1930s under the Circle Three Supplementary Naval Expansion Program (Maru San Keikaku).

Background
The Kagerō-class destroyers were outwardly almost identical to the preceding light cruiser-sized , with improvements made by Japanese naval architects to improve stability and to take advantage of Japan’s lead in torpedo technology. They were designed to accompany the Japanese main striking force and in both day and night attacks against the United States Navy as it advanced across the Pacific Ocean, according to Japanese naval strategic projections. Despite being one of the most powerful classes of destroyers in the world at the time of their completion, only one survived the Pacific War.

Shiranui, built at the Uraga Dock Company, was laid down on 30 August 1937, launched on 28 June 1938 and commissioned on 20 December 1939.

Operational history
At the time of the attack on Pearl Harbor, Shiranui, was assigned to Destroyer Division 18 (Desdiv 18), and a member of Destroyer Squadron 2 (Desron 2) of the IJN 2nd Fleet, and had deployed from Etorofu in the Kurile Islands, as part of the escort for Admiral Nagumo’s Carrier Strike Force. She returned to Kure on 24 December.

In February, she escorted the Japanese carriers in the Bombing of Darwin, and was then based at  Staring-baai in Sulawesi, Netherlands East Indies for patrols south of Java.

Shiranui departed Staring-baai on 27 March to escort the carrier force in the Indian Ocean raid on 27 March  After the Japanese air strikes on Colombo and Trincomalee in Ceylon, she returned to Kure Naval Arsenal for repairs on 23 April. She deployed from Saipan on 3 June as part of the escort for the troop convoy in the Battle of Midway.

On 28 June, she was assigned to escort the aircraft carrier  to Kiska in the Aleutian Islands on a supply mission. On 5 July, while outside Kiska Harbor, she was hit amidships by a torpedo fired by the submarine , which severed her bow, killing three crewmen. Her crew managed to keep her afloat and she took two months to limp back to Maizuru under tow, where she remained under repairs until 15 November 1943. During these repairs, her "X"-turret was replaced by two additional triple Type 96 25mm AA guns.

On 15 November 1943, Shiranui was assigned to the IJN 9th Fleet, and escorted convoys to Palau, Wewak and Hollandia during January and February 1944.
During the Battle of Leyte Gulf on 24–25 October 1944, Shiranui was assigned to Vice Admiral Shōji Nishimura’s diversionary force at the Battle of Surigao Strait. After the battle, she departed Coron to search for the missing cruiser  and destroyer , and took on survivors from the destroyer .

Shiranui  was  removed from the navy list on 10 December 1944.

See also 
 List of ships of the Japanese Navy

Notes

Books

External links
 CombinedFleet.com: Kagero-class destroyers
 CombinedFleet.com: Shiranuhi history

Shiranuhi
Shiranuhi
Ships of the Aleutian Islands campaign
Destroyers sunk by aircraft
Shipwrecks in the Sulu Sea
World War II shipwrecks in the Pacific Ocean
1938 ships
Ships built by Uraga Dock Company
Maritime incidents in October 1944
Ships lost with all hands
Ships sunk by US aircraft